Sick is the debut EP by American hardcore punk band Beartooth. It was released on July 26, 2013, through Red Bull Records for free download and is produced by Caleb Shomo formerly of the band Attack Attack! who sang and recorded all the instruments used on the album.

Background
Caleb Shomo began writing Beartooth songs while he was still in Attack Attack! as "a different musical outlet" as a way to make fun, punk-rock, hardcore, wild music, play crazy shows and have a good time without pressure from anything. The first release from this album was the song 'I Have a Problem', released on February 6, 2013 along with a live music video. The band was officially announced to be part of the roster for 'Red Bull Records' later that year in June. Later that month, the band released their EP via email subscription, and later toured with City Lights across the US throughout August to promote the EP.

Promotion
The band released a total of four music videos in promotion of the EP. Before the album's announcement, they released a live music video for 'I Have a Problem. They later released the other three videos for 'I Have a Problem' (not to be confused with their earlier live version), 'Pick Your Poison' and 'Go Be the Voice'. The song 'Go Be the Voice' was featured on Altpress article '11 New Songs You Need To Hear Right Now: November 2013 Edition' in promotion of the song, EP and then recent video.

Critical reception

HM Magazine reviewer Sarah Roberts stated that the EP was a powerful release. She praised the sound of the guitars during their use in heavy rhythms and the clarity of the vocals despite the dominance of the guitars. She recommended the album for those interested in hardcore punk music.

Track listing

I "I Have a Problem" was later re-recorded for Beartooth's debut album Disgusting.

Personnel
Beartooth
Caleb Shomo – vocals, all instruments
Production
Produced, mixed & mastered by Caleb Shomo

Release history

References

2013 debut EPs
Beartooth (band) EPs
Red Bull Records EPs